Following the settlement of the Jamestown colony in the early 1600's there was a vast gender inequality, as most of those who left for Jamestown were men who were tasked with building and establishing the settlement itself. Roughly a decade later, the lack of gender diversity drove these colonists to leave the colony in large numbers; to combat this issue, beginning in 1619, young single women from England were offered the opportunity to travel to Jamestown and become wives of the men there with the purpose to start families and to increase the population. The expense of the women's travels fell upon the men of the colony, who owed 150 pounds of tobacco to the Virginia Company which delivered these young women to their future spouses. These women were incentivized by the promise of land ownership, inheritance rights, as well as their own discretion to choose their own husband, all of which were luxuries not awarded to women who remained in England.

A total of around 90 women made the decision to travel to Jamestown on the first voyage in 1619, and by 1622, roughly 144 women had arrived to Jamestown.  The ages of the women varied; among the youngest of the women was Jane Dier, who was around fifteen to sixteen when she departed, and one of the oldest women was Alice Burges who was twenty-eight. Many tobacco brides came to America fleeing hardship, but many also suffered once in America. Despite their hardships, these women paved the way for the women of the future by escaping the assigned "maid" role and instead gaining more economic freedom and independence than was given to other women of this time, leading to some to dub them the "Founding Mothers".

See also
 Casquette girl
 Plaçage
 King's Daughters
 Marriage à la façon du pays
 Bride buying

References

History of women in the United States
History of tobacco
History of women in Virginia
Pre-statehood history of Virginia
Colony of Virginia
American frontier
17th-century American women